Provincial Trunk Highway 110 (PTH 110), also known as the Brandon Eastern Access Route, is a provincial highway in the vicinity of Brandon, Manitoba, Canada.  

PTH 110 is one of the four three-digit urban expressway routes in the Manitoba provincial highway network.  It is a two-lane highway that connects the Trans-Canada Highway (PTH 1) to PTH 10 south of Brandon.  It allows traffic going through Brandon to bypass the city, and provides easier access to the industrial areas located on the east side of the city.  The route is an important component of the City of Brandon's truck route network, as it allows dangerous goods carriers to minimize risks and traffic in urban neighbourhoods.

The first section of the highway between Richmond Avenue and PR 457, crossing the Assiniboine River, opened in 1995; PTH 110 was signed as "TEMP PTH 110" along PR 457 and PR 468 to connect with PTH 1. The second segment that connects Richmond Avenue to PTH 10 opened in 1999, while the last segment of the highway that connects PR 457 to the Trans-Canada Highway was completed in 2013. There is a proposal to extend PTH 110 west to the Trans-Canada Highway near Kemnay but there is no timeline for construction.

Major intersections

References

External links 
Official Highway Map of Manitoba - Brandon

110
Transport in Brandon, Manitoba